Panegyra cerussochlaena is a species of moth of the family Tortricidae. It is found in Ghana.

The wingspan is about 11 mm. The costal edge of the forewings is broadly bordered white creamy and the inner edge has three convexities. The terminal edge is creamy white and there is a small creamy blotch at the tornus, as well as brownish dots on the creamy parts of the wing. The hindwings are brownish grey.

References

Moths described in 2005
Tortricini
Moths of Africa
Taxa named by Józef Razowski